Transport in Saudi Arabia is facilitated through a relatively young system of roads, railways and seaways. Most of the network started construction after the discovery of oil in the Eastern Province in 1952, with the notable exception of Highway 40, which was built to connect the capital Riyadh to the economically productive Eastern Province, and later to the Islamic holy city of Mecca and the port city of Jeddah. With the economic growth of the 1970s, the Kingdom of Saudi Arabia has initiated many infrastructure development projects across the country, and the extensive development of the transportation network has followed suit in support of various economic developments.

History and overview

Road network 
The roads of Saudi Arabia gradually became the defining feature of the kingdom's transport system as the main population centres are not only scattered all over the country but also because they faced a major challenge from the geography of the country itself; separated by deserts, valleys and mountains, among other landforms. Due to this, a reliable road network became more important and essential than other modes of transport in the kingdom.

Saudi Arabia had encouraged road transport in the past by maintaining one of the lowest petrol prices in the world. Despite raising prices in 2018, it is worth noting that due to limited alternative passenger transport options in the country, the gasoline fuel demand is relatively inelastic to its prices; light-duty vehicles dominate the passenger transport landscape. Buses and other public transport options are limited, and walking or bicycles are hindered by the urban landscapes and harsh weather in most regions of the country.

The development of the Saudi road network can be divided into two major phases; i.e. the expansion of the modern road network from 1938 to 1970, preceding the initial development plans conceived by the Ministry of Transport, and the development and expansion after the introduction of the plans (after 1970). The two stages, pre-national planning and postnational planning, relate to the historical circumstances of the economic, political and social demands of the kingdom. The activity during the second stage greatly exceeds that during the first owing to the existence of coordinated plans, high investment and concentration of effort.

Rail network 
The first railway line in the kingdom predates the unification of Saudi Arabia. The 1,050 mm (3 ft 511⁄32 in) narrow-gauge Hejaz railway, that ran from Damascus to Medina, began construction in 1900 under the Ottoman Hejaz Vilayet, and was completed in 1908. A proposal to further extend the line to Mecca was made, but was never materialized. The southern portion of the line was mostly destroyed during the First world War. A few sections of the track remain, with some sections in Jordan being used up to today. The stations in Mada'in Salih and Medina have been converted into museums (Hejaz Railway Museum and Mada'in Salih Railway Station), each having some locomotives and rolling stock from the original railway.

The first railway line built and completed under Saudi rule was the  Dammam-Riyadh line, which began construction in 1947. It was inaugurated on October 20, 1951, by King Abdulaziz. This was before the formation of the Saudi Railways Organization, and the railway line was run and maintained by Saudi Aramco, before being entrusted to the Ministry of Finance. On May 13, 1966, a royal decree established the SRO, a public corporation that now runs the line. The main railway stations for passengers opened in Riyadh, Dammam, and Hofuf in 1981.

The other conventional railway line in the kingdom is the North–South line, also known as the Riyadh-Qurayyat line, which runs from the capital Riyadh to border with Jordan at Hadithah via Buraidah, Ha'il and Qurayyat, with feeder lines to multiple phosphate mining and bauxite mining locations in the northern parts of the kingdom. The only high-speed railway line in the kingdom, the Haramain high-speed railway line, was completed in 2017, and connects the two Islamic holy cities of Mecca and Medina via the King Abdulaziz International Airport in Jeddah and the King Abdullah Economic City near Rabigh.

Air transport 

Saudi Arabia is served by three major international airports: the King Khalid International Airport in Riyadh, the King Abdulaziz International Airport in Jeddah, and the King Fahd International Airport in Dammam, which is also the largest airport in the world by area. In addition to these three major airports, several smaller airports, providing both domestic and international connections, are present throughout the kingdom, such as the Prince Mohammad bin Abdulaziz International Airport in Medina and the Ta'if International Airport in Ta'if among others. 

The Saudi Arabian flag carrier, Saudia, started out in 1945 a single twin-engine Douglas DC-3 Dakota gifted by US President Franklin D. Roosevelt. The airline now operates more than 140 aircraft, providing a means of transport to more than 34 million annual passengers to 95 destinations around the world. Other major airlines in the country include Flynas, Flyadeal and SaudiGulf Airlines, among others. In addition to these public airlines, Saudi Aramco operates its own private airline, Saudi Aramco Aviation, with a fleet of 7 aircraft and their own terminals in several cases, which they use for the transportation of employees from several far-flung locations such as Shaybah, Yanbu and Tanajib.

Ports and waterways 
Historically, the area that is now Saudi Arabia was situated close to one end of the Silk Road, and the ports here made the many tribes in the region wealthy as they profited off the spice trade. Saudi Arabia is one of several countries without any rivers, however there are several wadis spread throughout the country that fill up during the rainy season of winter. However, due to their unstable nature, they are neither classified nor used as waterways. The Jeddah Islamic Port was the main gateway to pilgrims making the journey to the Islamic holy cities of Mecca and Medina before the advent of jet aircraft, and is said to have been given that status by the third Rashidun caliph, Uthman. One of the first ports built under the kingdom was located in Khobar, and was used to transport petroleum to Bahrain. The Saudi Ports Authority (Mawani) was founded in 1976 as a government agency to oversee and maintain the kingdom's ports, and it currently maintains 9 ports throughout the kingdom. Several other ports are not maintained by Mawani but by other entities, such as the King Abdullah Port in the King Abdullah Economic City near Rabigh.

Public transit systems 

The Saudi Public Transport Company (SAPTCO), known by its abbreviation SAPTCO, established in 1979 by a royal decree, operates a fleet of more than 4,500 vehicles with multiple routes throughout the kingdom. It transports approximately 8 million people monthly between the major cities of the kingdom. In addition to the transnational routes, SAPTCO also operates 10 international routes which transport approximately 500,000 people between the kingdom and the neighbouring Gulf states. SAPTCO operates special bus services during the Hajj pilgrimage, which carry approximately 15,000 pilgrims between the holy sites. One of Saudi Arabia's most sophisticated bus networks is that of the city of Medina, with 10 lines connecting different regions of the city. It serves approximately 20,000 passengers on a daily basis. 
SATPCO buses are gender-segregated.

Taxis are available in all major cities of the kingdom, in addition to the presence of private companies that offer vehicle hiring services, such as Uber and Careem, which is a subsidiary of Uber. A reflection of gender inequality, men travelling solo may sit in the passenger seat, but women are expected to sit in the rear seat. Before the reform in early 2020, Saudi cabs did not have meters; the price was agreed to up front and trips had to be booked in advance because of a 2012 "no hailing" regulation. Women had also been required to be accompanied by a male relative or another woman.

The Makkah Mass Rail Transit, also known as Mecca Metro, became the first rapid transit system to enter operation in Saudi Arabia after the completion of the Al Mashaaer Al Muqaddassah (S) line in 2010. Other rapid transit systems currently in development in the kingdom include:
 The Riyadh Metro, consisting of six lines to serve the capital city of Riyadh, which is expected to open in 2021.
 A three-line metro project in extension to the public transportation master plan in Medina, announced by the MMDA in 2015.
 The Jeddah Metro, under construction with projected completion in 2025, as of 2018.

Road transportation

Highway network 
The Ministry of Transport in 2014 maintained a total estimated road length of 627,000 km, of which 151,000 km were highways linking major regions of Saudi Arabia with international borders and serving as interconnecting roads between the major Saudi Arabian cities; 102,000 km were secondary roads linking major cities with other smaller cities in their respective provinces; 374,000 km were feeder roads branching out of secondary roads and serving towns, villages & agricultural areas. Another 204,000 km of roads was under construction by the end of fiscal year 2014. The Ministry of Transport maintains 151,000 km of major roads linking the major Saudi Arabian cities and the kingdom to its neighbors.

Most of these highways are two-lane highways, and some of them are not separated by median strips. The Ministry of Transport has been working on a project to gradually modernize these roads. On 19 February 2018, the speed limit on sections of Highway 15, Highway 40 and Highway 65 was increased from 120 km/h (75 mph) to 140 km/h (87 mph).

Rail transportation 
The historic 1,300 km (810 mi) 1,035 mm (3 ft 511⁄32 in) narrow-gauge Ottoman Hejaz railway was mostly destroyed during the First World War and its stations in Mada'in Salih and Medina have been converted to museums. This line was later converted to only be used for freight transport, with a new, shorter,  line being completed in 1985, exclusively for the transport of passengers. The other passenger line in the kingdom is the Riyadh–Qurayyat line, which runs through the middle of the country connecting the capital Riyadh to Ha'il, Majma'ah, the Al Jawf Province and Jordan via Qurayyat. It is the longest line in the Saudi rail network, and with a feeder line connecting it to the port of Ra's al-Khair, its total length comes up to around 2,750 km (1,710 mi). The North–South Railway line uses portions of the Riyadh–Qurayyat line and connects the main line to phosphate and bauxite mining locations in the northern reaches of the kingdom.

Apart from mass transit systems such as metros, the only high-speed railway line in the kingdom is the Haramain high-speed railway line, construction of which was completed in 2017. The line is 453 km (281 mi) long and connects the two Islamic holy cities of Mecca and Medina via the King Abdulaziz International Airport in Jeddah and the King Abdullah Economic City.

Air transportation 

Saudia, the flag carrier of the kingdom, started out in 1945 with a single twin-engine Douglas DC-3 Dakota gifted by US President Franklin D. Roosevelt. Over the century, the airline has now expanded to a fleet of more than 140 aircraft, transporting 34 million passengers annually to 95 destinations around the world. Saudia also operates the 13th-longest flight by distance in the world, SV 41, a  flight from Jeddah to Los Angeles. Other airlines, mostly low-cost carriers, have gradually become commonplace in the kingdom, the largest being Flynas. Founded in 2007, the company operates a fleet of 36 aircraft, providing connections to multiple domestic and international destinations. Its network is further extended through a codeshare agreement with Etihad Airways. Flyadeal and SaudiGulf Airlines, among others, are also common low-cost carriers, though these mostly operate domestic flights.

In addition to these public airlines, Saudi Aramco operates its own private airline, Saudi Aramco Aviation, with a fleet of 7 aircraft and multiple helicopters, and their own terminals in several cases, which they use for the transportation of employees to and from several far-flung locations such as Shaybah, Yanbu and Tanajib.

In 2019, the Saudi Public Investment Fund (PIF) launched the first commercial helicopter that will serve to transport customers within the major Saudi cities and to take them to different tourism destinations.

Water transportation 
Like all states in the Arabian Peninsula, Saudi Arabia does not have any rivers or inland waterways. This has not stopped the kingdom from pursuing the development of a water transportation network, primarily constructed to support the transport of petrochemicals. The Saudi Ports Authority (Mawani) runs and manages the major ports in the country, overseeing their operations. There are some other ports in the kingdom managed by other entities, such as the King Abdullah Port. The largest port on the Persian Gulf, the King Abdulaziz Port, is located in Dammam.

Ports

Economic impact 
The development of a road network plays an important role in the economic development of a country and therefore, the mileage of paved roads existing in a country is often used as an index to assess the extent of its development. The proper development of transport road network not only reduces the cost of transportation both in terms of money and time but also helps in the integration of various regions within the country and better understanding of neighbouring countries at the international level. The transport road network in Saudi Arabia contributed to the development of the country by bringing in direct benefits from its role in the development of some sectors such as minerals, agriculture, industry and commerce.

See also 

 Ministry of Transport (Saudi Arabia)
 Saudi Ports Authority
 Saudi Railway Company
 Saudi Railways Organization
 Saudi Public Transport Company (SAPTCO)

References

External links 

 A detailed map of the Saudi highway network can be found here
 A list of major airports and military airbases can be found here